This is a list of seasons completed by Barys Nur-Sultan.  This list documents the records and playoff results for all season the Barys have completed since their inception in 1999.

1999–2009: Kazakhstan Hockey Championship
Note: GP = Games played, W = Wins, L = Losses, T = Ties, OTW = Overtime Wins, OTL = Overtime Losses, Pts = Points, GF = Goals for, GA = Goals against

2004–2007: Pervaya Liga
Note: GP = Games played, W = Wins, L = Losses, T = Ties, OTW = Overtime Wins, OTL = Overtime Losses, Pts = Points, GF = Goals for, GA = Goals against

2007–2008: Vysshaya Liga
Note: GP = Games played, W = Wins, L = Losses, OTW = Overtime/shootout wins, OTL = Overtime/shootout losses, Pts = Points, GF = Goals for, GA = Goals against

2008–: Kontinental Hockey League

Note: GP = Games played, W = Wins, L = Losses, OTW = Overtime/shootout wins, OTL = Overtime/shootout losses, Pts = Points, GF = Goals for, GA = Goals against, PIM = Penalties in minutes

References

 
Barys Astana seasons